Schneider et Cie, also known as Schneider-Creusot for its birthplace in the French town of Le Creusot, was a historic French iron and steel-mill company which became a major arms manufacturer. In the 1960s, it was taken over by the Belgian Empain group and merged with it in 1969 to form Empain-Schneider, which in 1980 was renamed Schneider SA and in 1999, after much restructuring, Schneider Electric.

Origins

In 1836, Adolphe Schneider and his brother Eugène Schneider bought iron-ore mines and forges around Le Creusot (Saône-et-Loire). They developed a business dealing in steel, railways, armaments, and shipbuilding.

The Creusot steam hammer was built in 1877.

Somua, a subsidiary located near Paris, made machinery and vehicles, including the SOMUA S35 tank.

Armaments

Vehicles
Schneider CA1, the first French tank
Ferré, a 46-meter long submarine
Schneider-Creusot 030-T steam locomotive
Schneider Coast Defense Train

Mountain guns
 75 mm Schneider-Danglis 06/09 (named after Panagiotis Danglis)
 Canon de 75 M(montagne) modele 1919 Schneider
 Canon de 75 M(montagne) modele 1928
 76 mm mountain gun modèle 1909

Other artillery
 Canet guns
 Canon de 75 modèle 1897
 Canon de 75 modèle 1912 Schneider
 Canon de 75 modèle 1914 Schneider
 Canon anti-aérien de 75mm modèle 1939
 Canon de 85 modèle 1927 Schneider
 Canon de 105 modèle 1930 Schneider
 107 mm gun modèle 1910
 120 mm Schneider-Canet M1897 long gun
 122 mm howitzer modèle 1910
 152 mm howitzer modèle 1909
 152 mm howitzer modèle 1910
 152 mm siege gun modèle 1910
 155 mm Creusot Long Tom
 Canon de 155 C modèle 1917 Schneider
 Canon de 194 mle GPF
 Canon de 220 L mle 1917
 Mortier de 220 modèle 1915/1916 Schneider
 Mortier de 280 modèle 1914 Schneider

Schneider Trophy
Starting in 1911, Jacques Schneider offered the Schneider Trophy. It was a competition for seaplanes, with a large and prestigious prize.

See also
 Forges et Chantiers de la Gironde, part of the Schneider group between 1882 and 1927
 Somua, a truck manufacturer acquired by Schneider in 1914 and sold to Renault in 1955
 De Wendel family, long-standing competitors of the Schneiders
 Société Métallurgique de Normandie

Notes

Further reading
 Grant, Jonathan A. Grant, Between Depression and Disarmament: The International Armaments Business, 1919-1939 (Cambridge UP,  2018).  Online review

External links
  Lokomotive Schneider Creusot 1870

Defence companies of France
Manufacturing companies established in 1836
Manufacturing companies of France
Defunct locomotive manufacturers of France
Schneider Electric
Companies based in Bourgogne-Franche-Comté
French companies established in 1836